The 2001 Halton Borough Council election took place on 7 June 2001 to elect members of Halton Unitary Council in Cheshire, England. One third of the council was up for election and the Labour Party stayed in overall control of the council.

After the election, the composition of the council was:
Labour 45
Liberal Democrat 6
Independent 3
Conservative 1

Results
6 new councillors were elected in an election where turnout was 56%.

References

2001 English local elections
2001
2000s in Cheshire
June 2001 events in the United Kingdom